Leandro Rodrigo Kuszko (born 6 February 1990) is an Argentine professional footballer who plays as a winger for Platense.

Career
Born in Buenos Aires, Kuszko came through the youth categories of Boca Juniors. During the winter break of the 2010–11 season, Kuszko spent a few weeks on trial with Serbian club Partizan, alongside his teammate Gaston Amadeo Rossi, but failed to get a contract.

References

External links
 
 
 
 
 

1990 births
Living people
Argentine expatriate footballers
Argentine expatriate sportspeople in Brazil
Argentine footballers
Association football midfielders
Boca Juniors footballers
Club Atlético Platense footballers
Clube Náutico Marcílio Dias players
Expatriate footballers in Brazil
Club Atlético Huracán footballers
Footballers from Buenos Aires